Alfredo Francini (born 23 May 1905, date of death unknown) was an Italian racing cyclist. He rode in the 1927 Tour de France.

References

1905 births
Year of death missing
Italian male cyclists
Place of birth missing